Barbara Redshaw is a former international lawn and indoor bowls competitor for South Africa.

Bowls career
In 1993 she won the singles bronze medal at the inaugural Atlantic Bowls Championships.

In 1996 she won the gold medal in the triples at the 1996 World Outdoor Bowls Championship in Adelaide.

In 1997 she won the fours gold medal at the Atlantic Bowls Championships with Jannie de Beer, Lorna Trigwell and Hester Bekker.

References

Year of birth missing (living people)
South African female bowls players
Bowls World Champions
Bowls players at the 1994 Commonwealth Games
Commonwealth Games competitors for South Africa
Living people